Aqjeh Qaleh (also Romanized as Āqjeh Qal‘eh and Aqjeh Qal‘eh; also known as Āghjeh Qal‘eh, Akcha-Kalekh, Aqcha Qal‘eh, and Āqcheh Qal‘eh) is a village in Qareh Poshtelu-e Pain Rural District, Qareh Poshtelu District, Zanjan County, Zanjan Province, Iran. At the 2006 census, its population was 315, in 82 families.

References 

Populated places in Zanjan County